The C&C 41 is a Canadian sailboat, that was designed by Robert W. Ball at the request of Jim Plaxton, who had purchased C&C Yachts in 1981. Plaxton wanted an International Offshore Rule racer and the resulting design went into production in 1981.

Design
The C&C 41 is a recreational keelboat, built predominantly of fibreglass, with wood trim. It has a masthead sloop rig, a raked stem, a raised reverse transom, an internally-mounted spade-type rudder controlled by a wheel and a fixed fin keel or optionally keel and centreboard. The fixed keel version displaces  and carries  of lead ballast.

The boat was also produced in "GP" and "Limited Edition" models, both introduced in 1981 as well. Length overall is the same for all models, but the waterline length varies.

The boat is fitted with a Japanese Yanmar 3HM35F diesel engine.

The fixed fin keel base design has a PHRF racing average handicap of 108 with a high of 111 and low of 105.

See also
List of sailing boat types

References

External links
 Original Factory Brochure - C&C 41, 2 page, colour
 Original Factory Brochure - C&C 41, 8 page, colour

Keelboats
1980s sailboat type designs
Sailing yachts
Sailboat type designs by Robert W. Ball
Sailboat types built by C&C Yachts